The  De Vries–Fransen van de Putte cabinet was the cabinet of the Netherlands from 6 July 1872 until 27 August 1873. The cabinet was formed by Independent Liberals (Ind. Lib.) after the death of Prime Minister Johan Rudolph Thorbecke on 4 June 1872. The Centre-right cabinet was a majority government in the House of Representatives. Independent Liberal Conservative Gerrit de Vries was Prime Minister.

Cabinet Members

 Resigned.
 Served ad interim.
 Retained this position from the previous cabinet.

References

External links
Official

  Kabinet-De Vries/Fransen van de Putte Parlement & Politiek

Cabinets of the Netherlands
1872 establishments in the Netherlands
1874 disestablishments in the Netherlands
Cabinets established in 1872
Cabinets disestablished in 1872
Minority governments